Lloyd Meek (born 22 April 1998) is an Australian rules footballer who plays for the Hawthorn Football Club in the Australian Football League (AFL), having previously played for the Fremantle Football Club.

Early career

Originally from Mininera, a farming area west of Ballarat, where he attended Ballarat Grammar school. As a junior, Meek played for the SMW Rovers, the Greater Western Victoria Rebels in the TAC Cup Under 18s competition and for Victoria Country in the 2017 AFL Under 18 Championships.  In 2017 he also played four games for North Ballarat Football Club in the Victorian Football League (VFL). Meek played for Fremantle's reserves team, Peel Thunder, in the West Australian Football League (WAFL) in 2018 and 2019.

AFL career

He was recruited by Fremantle with their sixth selection, 69th overall, in the 2017 AFL draft. He made his AFL debut against  in the opening round of the 2021 AFL season, his fourth season at the club.

Statistics
 Statistics are correct to the end of 2022

|-
| 2018 ||  || 22
| 0 || — || — || — || — || — || — || — || — || — || — || — || — || — || — || — || — || 0
|-
| 2019 ||  || 22
| 0 || — || — || — || — || — || — || — || — || — || — || — || — || — || — || — || — || 0
|-
| 2020 ||  || 22
| 0 || — || — || — || — || — || — || — || — || — || — || — || — || — || — || — || — || 0
|-
| 2021 ||  || 22
| 9 || 1 || 2 || 21 || 58 || 79 || 12 || 14 || 129 || 0.1 || 0.2 || 2.3 || 6.4 || 8.8 || 1.3 || 1.6 || 14.3 || 0
|-
| 2022 ||  || 22
| 6 || 2 || 0 || 26 || 43 || 69 || 12 || 15 || 117 || 0.3 || 0.0 || 4.3 || 7.2 || 11.5 || 2.0 || 2.5 || 19.5 || 0
|- class="sortbottom"
! colspan=3| Career
! 15 !! 3 !! 2 !! 47 !! 101 !! 148 !! 24 !! 29 !! 246 !! 0.2 !! 0.1 !! 3.1 !! 6.7 !! 9.9 !! 1.6 !! 1.9 !! 16.4 !! 0
|}

Notes

References

External links

1998 births
Living people
Fremantle Football Club players
Peel Thunder Football Club players
North Ballarat Football Club players
Greater Western Victoria Rebels players
Australian rules footballers from Victoria (Australia)
Hawtohrn Football Club players